was a Japanese sculptor and painter. He was born in Miyagi Prefecture and grew up in Hokkaido. In 1932 he moved to Tokyo to become a painter. Becoming influenced by Aristide Maillol and Charles Despiau, Sato decided to specialize in sculpture. He graduated from the Tokyo School of Fine Arts.

From 1934 on, Sato spent the next seventy years making art works primarily from bronze to much acclaim. He was a dedicated artist working from 8am until 8pm every day and died on 30 March 2011 at the age of 98.

References 

1912 births
2011 deaths
Japanese sculptors
Artists from Miyagi Prefecture
Tokyo School of Fine Arts alumni